Am Ohmberg is a municipality in the district of Eichsfeld, in Thuringia, Germany. It was formed by the merger of the previously independent municipalities Bischofferode, Großbodungen and Neustadt, on 1 December 2010.

References

Eichsfeld (district)